During the 1949-50 season Associazione Calcio Milan competed in Serie A.

Summary 
For the 1949-50 campaign arrived to the club, thanks to the management talent of President Umberto Trabattoni, in  1948 Olympic Games Swedish players Nils Liedholm  and Gunnar Gren, they were added to the squad along with striker Gunnar Nordahl, actually in Milano since January 1949: a “trio” known as Gre-No-Li. Another transfer in was goalkeeper Lorenzo Buffon. Also, in this season Milan played at Arena Civica meanwhile in San Siro the team played the matches where higher attendances were expected.

This season was best remembered for fans as crucial to the modern Milan era winning titles in years for coming after forty years without a trophy. The squad changed its playing style with a more offensive strategy with spectacular matches instead of physical and defensive tactic. The change of strategy attracted more fans to the stadium and attendances will improve in the next decades.

During 1949-50 Serie A campaign, first season after the Superga disaster, the squad reached the goal scoring record for a single season: 118 goals scored. On 7 February 1950, Milan defeated Juventus 7–1 in Torino, also the first TV broadcasting of a Serie A match. Hungarian coach Lajos Czeizler took the club to the second place five points behind champion Juventus. Swedish striker Nordahl won his first topgoalscorer title “capocannoniere” with 35 goals scored.

During 1949 the club moved its headquarters from "Telegrafo Calciomilano" in Del Lauro 4 to Venezia 36.

Squad 

 (Captain)

 (vice-captain)

Transfers

Competitions

Serie A

League table

Matches

Statistics

Squad statistics

Players statistics

See also 
 A.C. Milan

References

Bibliography

External links 
 

1949 in Italian sport
1950 in Italian sport
A.C. Milan seasons